Mount Carbon is a census-designated place (CDP) in Fayette County, West Virginia, United States. Mount Carbon has a post office with ZIP code 25139. As of the 2010 census, its population was 428.

Namesake
Mount Carbon was named for nearby coal deposits, a carbon-based fuel.

References

Census-designated places in Fayette County, West Virginia
Census-designated places in West Virginia
Populated places on the Kanawha River